"Birks' Works" is a 1951 jazz standard written by Dizzy Gillespie. The title refers to Gillespie's middle name, "Birks". It was the title track of Gillespie's 1957 album Birks' Works.

See also
List of jazz standards

References

1950s jazz standards
1951 songs
Compositions by Dizzy Gillespie